Prosenická Lhota is a municipality and village in Příbram District in the Central Bohemian Region of the Czech Republic. It has about 500 inhabitants.

Administrative parts
Villages of Břišejov, Klimětice, Luhy, Prosenice and Suchdol are administrative parts of Prosenická Lhota.

References

Villages in Příbram District